François Van der Elst (1 December 1954 – 11 January 2017) was a Belgian footballer, who mainly won different national and European trophies while at R.S.C. Anderlecht.

Early years 
"Swat" Van der Elst was born in Opwijk, Flemish Brabant. In the youth series of the local team, he always played in midfield but particularly stood out for his dribbling and scoring skills.

Club career
From 1969 to 1980 he played for Anderlecht. At the age of 16, he made his debut for the senior squad. Despite being drafted in different positions (forward, right winger or full-back), he would go on to total 82 Belgian Pro League goals, surpassing 100 overall. Van Der Elst was praised for scoring decisive goals. In 1976, he was part of the 1975–76 European Cup Winners' Cup-winning squad, netting twice in the final against West Ham United (4–2) and, in the following season's league, was crowned the competition's top scorer at 21 goals as the Brussels side finished in second position. With Anderlecht, he eventually won two national titles and four cups between 1971 and 1980. Van der Elst won the European Cup Winners' Cup twice, in 1976 and 1978, scoring 18 goals in the competition, the 4th most of any player.

In January 1982, after a brief United States spell with the New York Cosmos, Van der Elst signed with West Ham United for £400,000, proceeding to score 17 times in 70 overall appearances. He continued his career back home, with K.S.C. Lokeren, but was forced to end it after a after a fibula fracture substained at the start of the 1985-86 season.

International career
Van der Elst earned 44 caps and netted 14 goals for Belgium, helping the nation to the second place in the UEFA Euro 1980 tournament. He was part of the squad that competed at the 1982 FIFA World Cup, playing the second halves of the 1–0 win over El Salvador for the first group stage (in Elche) and the 0–3 loss to Poland for the second group phase (Barcelona).

Personal life and death
Van der Elst's younger brother, Leo, was also a professional footballer. Both were Belgium internationals.

After his career, Van der Elst owned a snooker and billiards bar in his hometown of Opwijk. On New Year's Day 2017, Van der Elst suffered heart failure and was placed in an induced coma in intensive care. Ten days later, reports emerged that at 3:00 am that morning he had died from a cardiac arrest while still hospitalized, aged 62.

Honours 

 RSC Anderlecht

 Belgian First Division: 1971–72, 1973–74
 Belgian Cup: 1971–72, 1972–73, 1974–75, 1975–76
 Belgian League Cup: 1973, 1974
 European Cup Winners' Cup: 1975–76 (winners), 1976-77 (runners-up), 1977–78 (winners)
 European Super Cup: 1976, 1978
 Amsterdam Tournament: 1976
Tournoi de Paris: 1977
 Jules Pappaert Cup: 1977
 Belgian Sports Merit Award: 1978

 New York Cosmos

 North American Soccer League: 1980

International 
Belgium

 UEFA European Championship: 1980 (runners-up)
 Belgian Sports Merit Award: 1980

Individual 

 Belgian First Division top scorer: 1976-77 (21 goals)
European Cup Winners Cup Top Scorer: 1977-78 (6 goals)
 Ballon d'Or nomination: 1978

References

External links
 Anderlecht biography 
 
 
 
 

1954 births
2017 deaths
People from Opwijk
Footballers from Flemish Brabant
Belgian footballers
Association football wingers
Belgian Pro League players
R.S.C. Anderlecht players
K.S.C. Lokeren Oost-Vlaanderen players
English Football League players
West Ham United F.C. players
North American Soccer League (1968–1984) players
New York Cosmos players
Belgium international footballers
UEFA Euro 1980 players
1982 FIFA World Cup players
Belgian expatriate footballers
Expatriate soccer players in the United States
Expatriate footballers in England
Belgian expatriate sportspeople in the United States
Belgian expatriate sportspeople in England